The Ministry of Economic Planning and Investment Promotion is a government ministry, responsible for economic planning and investment in Zimbabwe.

See also
Investment promotion agency

References

Government of Zimbabwe
Economy of Zimbabwe
Zimbabwe
Zimbabwe